Liviu Radu  (20 November 1948 – 17 October 2015) was a Romanian science-fiction writer and translator.

Work

Novels
Trip-Tic (1999)
Opțiunea (2004) 
Spaime (2004, republished in 2014) 
 Waldemar series
Waldemar (2007)
Blocul câș (2008); 
O după-amiază cu bere și zâne (2009) 
Vânzoleli nocturne (2012) 
Lumea lui Waldemar (2010, omnibus)
Modificatorii (2010)
Chestionar pentru doamne care au fost secretarele unor bărbați foarte cumsecade (2011) 
 Taravik series
Armata moliilor (2012) 
 La galop prin piramida (2013) 
Înfruntarea nemuritorilor (2014)

Collections
Spre Ierusalim (2000)
Constanța 1919 (2000) 
Babl (2004) 
Cifrele sunt reci, numerele-s calde (2006) 
Povestiri fantastice (2008) 
Ghicit de seară. 77 povești foarte scurte (2010) 
Singur pe Ormuza (2011) 
Golem, Golem și alte povestiri fantastice (2014) 
Între cer și pământ (2015)

Short stories
Spre Ierusalim (2000)
Constanța 1919 (2000) 
Babel (2004) 
Cifrele sunt reci, numerele-s calde (2006). Translated in English as Digits Are Cold, Numbers Are Warm (2012)
Povestiri fantastice (2008) 
Ghicit de seară (2010) 
Singur pe Ormuza (2011). Translated in English as Alone on Ormuza (2012).
Golem, golem (2014) 
Între cer și pământ (2015)

References

External links
Liviu Radu, ISFDB.org

See also
List of Romanian science fiction writers

1948 births
2015 deaths
Romanian science fiction writers
Romanian translators
20th-century translators